Dog Eat Dog (released as Einer frisst den anderen in Germany) is a 1964 German crime drama film that starred Jayne Mansfield, Cameron Mitchell, Dodie Heath, Ivor Salter, Isa Miranda, Elisabeth Flickenschildt, Werner Peters, and Pinkas Braun.

Filming occurred in late 1963 in Yugoslavia. Mansfield was pregnant with Mariska Hargitay during filming.

Plot
Three robbers, Lylle Corbett (Mitchell), Dolph Kostis (Salter), and Darlene (Mansfield), steal one-million dollars from a shipment on its way to the United States. But, instead of sharing the dough with Lylle, Dolph, decides to kill him, without Darlene (who likes them both), knowing it. When returning to Darlene (his wife), at the Hotel Americano's, Dolph, informs her that Lylle is out of the picture and that she should forget about him. Before Dolph had returned, Darlene, had been visited by the hotel's manager Livio Morelli (Braun), who was there to request her to turn down the volume on her radio. Livio sees a one-thousand dollar bill under the edge of the bed, and quickly knows that they are the robbers; that he had recently heard about on the radio; and that they call themselves "Mr. and Mrs. Smithopolis".

As a break away, to not getting caught, Dolph and Darlene, make a get-a-way on a rental boat. However, they unaware that the owner of the hotel's innocent-looking sister, Sandra (Heath), is in the back of the boat and has planted a bomb, to kill the pair, and take off with the million for she and her brother...Lylle, who is supposed to be dead, is also in the boat; who later holds them hostage.

Arriving on an "deserted" island, Lylle, ensures everyone that he is in charge. However, Lady Xenia (Flickenschildt) and her butler Jannis (Peters), are on the island, so Lady Xenia can die in peace. Also arriving on the island is hotel owner, Livio, who has left his "girlfriend", Madame Benoit (Miranda), at the hotel to take care of the police detective (Robert Gardett), who has been asking questions about the robbers. But what Dolph, Lylle, and Darlene, don't know is; everyone else there on the island knows they're the robbers of the one-million dollars, and that they want the money.

After a while on the island, people are starting to be killed, with the killer being unknown. Lylle, suspects the killer to be the holder of the one-million dollars or a person looking for it. After Dolph dies, with Livio and Jannis following after, Lylle goes insane searching for the million. In the end, Lylle, finds out that Sandra, the so innocent-looking girl is the killer and the holder of the dough. Before the films ending, Lylle and Sandra, fall over a cliff, as a result of fighting for the money, and die. Darlene, now the last woman standing, drowns herself in the water, while the police are arriving on the island.

Cast
Jayne Mansfield - Darlene/Mrs. Smithopolis (Voiced by Carolyn De Fonseca)
Cameron Mitchell - Lylle Corbett (Voiced by Dan Sturkie)
Dodie Heath - Sandra Morelli (billed as: "Dody Heath")
Ivor Salter - Dolph Kostis/Mr. Smithopolis
Isa Miranda - Madame Benoit
Elisabeth Flickenschildt - Lady Xenia
Werner Peters - Jannis, Xenia's butler
Pinkas Braun - Livio Morelli
Robert Gardett - Police Detective Gino
Ines Taddio - Hotel Singer
Siegfried Lowitz - Bank Guard (scenes deleted)
Aldo Camarda - Hotel Barman

Selected release dates
West GermanyJune 26, 1964
ItalyDecember 17, 1964
United KingdomJune 13, 1965
United StatesJuly 13, 1966

Alternative titles
La môme aux dollarsBelgium
An Act of ViolenceInternational (pre-release title)
Dog Eat Dog!United States
Dollars GirlBelgium (dubbed version)
L'ora di uccidereItaly
When Strangers MeetUnited Kingdom
La morte vestita di dollariItaly (reissue title)
Estranho EncontroPortugal (dubbed version)
O thanatos itan ntymenos me dollariaGreece

Publicity promotion
It has been said that Jayne Mansfield's name was mentioned first, on the posters, in order to get the film some good publicity. However, in the film's opening credits, Mansfield is billed last; as: "and Jayne Mansfield as Darlene"; she was also billed this way in most of the film's movie trailers. Even though Mansfield was capitalized as the movie's star, she was more of a supporting character.

Background
Jayne Mansfield called the film: "The best role of my career." American audiences wanted to know where this role was, for Einer frisst den anderen was not released to American theaters until two years after its official German release, in 1964. When released in the U.S.. it was released as Dog Eat Dog!, and flopped as it did everywhere else. Today the feature carries on a cult gathering, as a forever "gold-digging" classic.

References

External links

1964 films
West German films
Italian crime films
German crime films
German black-and-white films
Italian black-and-white films
Films directed by Richard E. Cunha
Films set on islands
Films set in the Mediterranean Sea
Films shot in Croatia
Films shot in Yugoslavia
1964 crime films
1960s German-language films
English-language German films
English-language Italian films
1960s Italian films
1960s German films